Charlotte Vale-Allen (January 19, 1941 – January 12, 2023) was a writer of contemporary fiction. She lived in the United Kingdom from 1961 to 1964 working as a singer and actress. She emigrated to the United States in 1966 following a brief return to Canada. After marrying Walter Bateman Allen Jr. in 1970, she moved to Connecticut where she later lived.

Biography
Charlotte Vale-Allen was born on January 19, 1941, in Toronto, Ontario, Canada and lived in England from 1961 to 1964 where she worked as a television actress and singer. She returned to Toronto briefly, performing as a singer and in cabaret revues until she emigrated to the United States in 1966.

Vale married Walter Bateman Allen Jr. in 1970. They made their home in Connecticut and she began to write. Her first book, Daddy's Girl, was written in 1971, but was initially rejected by editors who considered the topic of incest too contentious. It was eventually published in 1980.

Bibliography

As Charlotte Vale-Allen
Hidden Meanings	1976 Island Nation Press reissue
Love Life	        1976 Island Nation Press reissue
Sweeter Music	1976 Island Nation Press reissue
Another Kind of Magic 1977 subsequently combined with HIDDEN MEANINGS	
Gentle Stranger  	1977 Island Nation Press reissue
Mixed Emotions 	1977 Island Nation Press reissue
Running Away	1977 Island Nation Press reissue
Becoming	        1978 Island Nation Press reissue
Believing in Giants1978 reissued as MEMORIES Island Nation Press reissue
Gifts of Love	1978 Island Nation Press reissue
Julia's Sister	1978 Island Nation Press reissue
Meet Me in Time 	1978 Island Nation Press reissue
Acts of Kindness 	1979 Island Nation Press reissue
Moments of Meaning 1979 Island Nation Press reissue
Times of Triumph	1979 Island Nation Press reissue
Daddy's Girl	1980 Island Nation Press reissue
Promises	        1980 Island Nation Press reissue
Perfect Fools	1981 Island Nation Press reissue
The Marmalade Man  1981—issued in paperback as DESTINIES	Island Nation Press reissue
Intimate Friends	1983 Island Nation Press reissue
Pieces of Dreams	1984 Island Nation Press reissue
Matters of the Heart1985 Island Nation Press reissue
Time/Steps	        1986 Island Nation Press reissue
Illusions	        1987 Island Nation Press reissue
Dream Train	1988 Island Nation Press reissue
Night Magic	1989 Island Nation Press reissue
Painted Lives	1990 Island Nation Press reissue
Leftover Dreams	1992 Island Nation Press reissue
Dreaming in Color	1993 Island Nation Press reissue
Somebody's Baby	1995 Island Nation Press reissue
Claudia's Shadow	1996 Island Nation Press reissue
Mood Indigo 	1997 Island Nation Press reissue
Parting Gifts	2001 Island Nation Press reissue
Grace Notes	2002 Island Nation Press reissue
The Young Person's Dreambook, An Abuse Workbook, 2002  companion to Daddy's Girl
Fresh Air	        2003 Island Nation Press reissue
Sudden Moves	2004 Island Nation Press reissue
Where Is the Baby? 2012/ (Severn House)

As Katharine Marlowe
Heart's Desires 1991 Island Nation Press reissue
Secrets 1992 Island Nation Press reissue
Nightfall 1993 Island Nation Press reissue

References

External links
 Charlotte Vale Allen official website

1941 births
2023 deaths
Canadian expatriates in England
Canadian expatriate writers in the United States
21st-century Canadian novelists
Canadian women novelists
21st-century Canadian women writers
Canadian expatriate writers